Penumalli Madhu is a politician from Communist Party of India (Marxist). He was CPI(M) Andhra Pradesh state secretary. He is a former Member of the Parliament of India who represented Andhra Pradesh in the Rajya Sabha, the upper house of the Indian Parliament.

References

External links
 http://cpimap.org/

Communist Party of India (Marxist) politicians from Andhra Pradesh
Rajya Sabha members from Andhra Pradesh
Year of birth missing (living people)
Living people
Telugu politicians